Taus may refer to:

 Domažlice (German: Taus), a town of the Czech Republic
 Taus, Wisconsin, United States, an unincorporated community
 Melek Taus, "The Peacock Angel", the Yazidis' name for the central figure of their faith
 Taus (instrument), a string instrument from India
 The plural of the Greek letter tau
 The plural of subatomic tau particle

es:Tau